Rhysotina is a genus of minute, air-breathing land snails, terrestrial pulmonate gastropod mollusks or micromollusks in the subfamily Rhysotininae of the family Urocyclidae.

Species
Species within the genus Rhysotina include:
 Rhysotina hepatizon (Gould, 1845)
 Rhysotina sublaevis G. A. Holyoak & D. T. Holyoak, 2016
 Rhysotina welwitschi (Morelet, 1866)

References

 Morelet, A., 1866. - --Coquilles nouvelles recueillies par le Dr. Fr. Welwitsch dans l'Afrique équatoriale et particulièrement dans les provinces d'Angola et de Benguela. Journal de Conchyliologie 14: 153-163
 Morelet A. ["1868"], 1867 Voyage du Dr Friederich Welwitsch exécuté par ordre du Gouvernement Portugais dans les royaumes d'Angola et de Benguella (Afrique équinoxiale). Mollusques terrestres et fluviatiles, p. 102 pp, 9 pls
 Holyoak D.T. & Holyoak G.A. (2016). Revision of Rhysotina (Gastropoda: Urocyclidae) land-snails endemic to the West African island of São Tomé. Journal of Conchology. 42(3): 59-72

Urocyclidae